LOT Polish Airlines Flight LO 165 was an Antonov An-24 aircraft, registration SP-LTF, operating a scheduled passenger flight from Warsaw to Krakow Balice airport. It crashed into a mountain on 2 April 1969 at 16:08 local time (UTC+1) during a snowstorm. All 53 people (47 passengers and 6 crew) on board were killed.

Flight history

Introduction
Much of the known information about the accident comes from two newspaper articles published in 1994. Their author wrote that, even 25 years after the accident, most documentation on the crash remained classified. Reports were based on the accounts of participants in the rescue action and some members of the accident investigation commission who asked for anonymity.

Flight
The aircraft took off at 15:20 local time for a 55-minute flight to Krakow's Balice Airport. The captain was Czesław Doliński.

A military radar registered the aircraft at that time at  altitude. The pilots informed controllers in Okęcie and Balice when the plane had passed Jędrzejów VOR, but caused confusion by providing three different passage times a few minutes apart.

In the next eight minutes, a series of radio exchanges took place between the aircraft and the Balice radar operator, with the captain repeatedly asking for his fix and reporting problems with the beacon signal, and the operator asking for the aircraft's position and altitude to help him find the aircraft on the radar screen. The last transmission received from the airplane was, "Left turn to further...-" at 16:08.17. Seconds after that, radio contact was lost.

Controversy 
The official death toll of 53 remains controversial. The LOT manifest included 53 passengers and 5 crew members, but two days after the crash Polish press agencies published (based on LOT's information) 46 surnames (part of them without an address or name). Among the passengers were 49 Poles, 3 Americans, and a Briton.

The official accident report, published in 1970, blamed the accident on the captain becoming lost. No reasons were given as to why the aircraft, just before the crash, was flying at low altitude some  past its intended destination.

After the accident, the code 165 was still used by the airline. In 1978, the flight was hijacked by two women who are seeking political asylum in West Germany.

See also 
 List of Poland disasters by death toll
 LOT Polish Airlines Flight 007
 LOT Polish Airlines Flight 5055
 LOT Polish Airlines Flight 703

References

External links 
 

Aviation accidents and incidents in 1969
1969 in Poland
165
Aviation accidents and incidents in Poland
Accidents and incidents involving the Antonov An-24
Airliner accidents and incidents caused by weather
Airliner accidents and incidents involving controlled flight into terrain
April 1969 events in Europe
1969 disasters in Poland